Process optimization is the discipline of adjusting a process so as to optimize (make the best or most effective use of) some specified set of parameters without violating some constraint.  The most common goals are minimizing cost and maximizing throughput and/or efficiency.  This is one of the major quantitative tools in industrial decision making.

When optimizing a process, the goal is to maximize one or more of the process specifications, while keeping all others within their constraints. This can be done by using a process mining tool, discovering the critical activities and bottlenecks, and acting only on them.

Areas 
Fundamentally, there are three parameters that can be adjusted to affect optimal performance.  They are:
 Equipment optimization
The first step is to verify that the existing equipment is being used to its fullest advantage by examining operating data to identify equipment bottlenecks.

 Operating procedures
Operating procedures may vary widely from person-to-person or from shift-to-shift.  Automation of the plant can help significantly.  But automation will be of no help if the operators take control and run the plant in manual.

 Control optimization
In a typical processing plant, such as a chemical plant or oil refinery, there are hundreds or even thousands of control loops.  Each control loop is responsible for controlling one part of the process, such as maintaining a temperature, level, or flow.

If the control loop is not properly designed and tuned, the process runs below its optimum.  The process will be more expensive to operate, and equipment will wear out prematurely.  For each control loop to run optimally, identification of sensor, valve, and tuning problems is important.  It has been well documented that over 35% of control loops typically have problems.

The process of continuously monitoring and optimizing the entire plant is sometimes called performance supervision.

See also 
 Calculation of glass properties, optimization of several properties
 Deficit irrigation to optimize water productivity
 Process simulation
 Taguchi methods

External links
 Reference TEXTBOOKS on Taguchi Methods
 TORSCHE Scheduling Toolbox for Matlab is a freely available toolbox of scheduling and graph algorithms.
 HillStormer, a Tool for constrained Optimization by Nelder & Mead in Industry and Research.

Business process management
Mathematical optimization in business